Arrogance or Arrogant may refer to:

Music
Arrogance (band), an American rock band active since the 1970s
 "Arrogance", a song by Prince from the Love Symbol Album
Arrogant (EP), a 2014 EP by Medina

Ships
 HMS Arrogant
 Arrogant-class cruiser

See also
 Hubris
 Pride
 The Arrogant, a 1987 film